Christian Molina may refer to:

Christian Molina (director) (born 1979), Spanish director
Christian Molina (footballer) (born 1998), Salvadorian footballer